The arrondissement of Strasbourg is an arrondissement of France in the Bas-Rhin department in the Grand Est region. It has 33 communes.

Composition

The communes of the arrondissement of Strasbourg are:

Achenheim
Bischheim
Blaesheim
Breuschwickersheim
Eckbolsheim
Eckwersheim
Entzheim
Eschau
Fegersheim
Geispolsheim
Hangenbieten
Hœnheim
Holtzheim
Illkirch-Graffenstaden
Kolbsheim
Lampertheim
Lingolsheim
Lipsheim
Mittelhausbergen
Mundolsheim
Niederhausbergen
Oberhausbergen
Oberschaeffolsheim
Osthoffen
Ostwald
Plobsheim
Reichstett
Schiltigheim
Souffelweyersheim
Strasbourg
Vendenheim
La Wantzenau
Wolfisheim

History

The arrondissement of Strasbourg was created in 1800 and disbanded in 1871 (ceded to Germany). In January 2015 it was recreated from the former arrondissement of Strasbourg-Ville and 32 communes from the former arrondissement of Strasbourg-Campagne.

References

Strasbourg